Lancewood may refer to:

Trees
 Acacia shirleyi, Acacia petraea and Acacia rothii, Australian trees
 Annona dolabripetala, a Brazilian tree in the genus Annona
 Backhousia subargentea, a rare Australian rainforest tree 
 Backhousia myrtifolia, Australian lancewood
 Curtisia dentata, Cape lancewood
 Calycophyllum candidissimum, a tropical American tree in the genus Calycophyllum
 Dissiliaria baloghioides, an eastern Australian tree in the genus Dissiliaria
 Harpullia pendula, Tulipwood or Tulip lancewood, a small to medium-sized rainforest tree from Australia
 Harpullia arborea, a tree found in Asia and the Pacific
 Homalium spp., Homalium foetidum, Homalium bhamoense, Homalium tomentosum Moulmein lancewood etc., Burma lancewood
 Manilkara bidentata, Red lancewood
 Mosannona depressa, a tree from Central America in the genus Mosannona
 Nematolepis squamea, an Australian tree
 Olearia lacunosa, a shrub from New Zealand, lancewood tree daisy
 Oxandra spp., Oxandra lanceolata  West Indian, Black or True lancewood, Oxandra laurifolia White or Laurelleaf lancewood etc., native to South America and the Caribbean
 Pseudopanax crassifolius Horoeka, a New Zealand tree
 Pseudopanax ferox, a New Zealand tree, Savage or Fierce lancewood and Toothed lancewood
 Xylopia hastarum, a Caribbean tree, White lancewood

Other
 USS Lancewood (AN-48), a 1943 US Navy ship in World War II

See also 
 Tulipwood (disambiguation)
 Lance (disambiguation)